"Scarlet Knight" is the 23rd single by Japanese singer and voice actress Nana Mizuki, released on April 13, 2011, together with her 24th single, "Pop Master".

Track listing 
 "Scarlet Knight"
Lyrics: Nana Mizuki
Composition, arrangement: Hitoshi Fujima (Elements Garden)
Opening theme for anime television series Dog Days 
Ending theme for TV Asahi program Onegai! Ranking in April
Ending theme for Ehime Asahi TV program  Love Chu! Chu! in April
 "High-Stepper"
Lyrics: Sayuri Katayama
Composition, arrangement: Shinya Saito
Ending theme for TBS TV program Osama no Brunch in April and May

Charts

Oricon Sales Chart (Japan)

References

2011 singles
Nana Mizuki songs
Songs written by Nana Mizuki